For information on all Lamar University sports, see Lamar Cardinals and Lady Cardinals

The 2015–16 Lamar Lady Cardinals basketball team represented Lamar University during the 2015–16 NCAA Division I women's basketball season. The Lady Cardinals, led by third year head coach Robin Harmony, played their home games at the Montagne Center and are members of the Southland Conference. They finished the season with a 12-19 overall record and a 7-11 conference record.  Qualifying for the conference tournament, the Lady Cardinals won the first game against Houston Baptist and were eliminated by McNeese State.

Two Lady Cardinals were recognized by the Southland Conference at the conclusion of the regular season. Chastadie Barrs was named Southland Conference Defensive Player of the Year. Kiara Desamours was named Southland Conference Freshman of the year.  Both players also received conference honorable mention honors.

Roster

Schedule 

|-
!colspan=12 style="background:#CC2233; color:#FFFFFF;"| Out of Conference Schedule

|-
!colspan=12 style="background:#CC2233; color:#FFFFFF;"| Southland Conference Schedule

|-
!colspan=12 style="background:#CC2233; color:#FFFFFF;"| Southland Conference Tournament

See also 
2015–16 Lamar Cardinals basketball team

References 

Lamar Lady Cardinals basketball seasons
Lamar
Lamar Lady Cardinals basketball
Lamar Lady Cardinals basketball